Yumyeongsan is a mountain in Gyeonggi-do in South Korea. Its area extends over the counties of Gapyeong and Yangpyeong.

See also
 List of mountains in Korea

Notes

References
 

Mountains of South Korea
Mountains of Gyeonggi Province

zh:有明山